The Palawan crow (Corvus pusillus) is a Passerine bird of the family Corvidae, in the genus Corvus. It was previously considered a subspecies of the slender-billed crow (Corvus enca), but phylogenetic evidence indicates that both are distinct species, and it has thus been split by the International Ornithologists' Union.

It is endemic to the Philippines, where it is found on Mindoro, Palawan, and the Calamian Islands. Its natural habitats are subtropical or tropical moist lowland forest and subtropical or tropical mangrove forest.

References

Palawan crow
Palawan crow
Endemic birds of the Philippines
Birds of Palawan